Portuguese Women’s Rugby Super Cup (Union/Sevens)

The Supertaça de Portugal de Rugby Feminino (English: Portuguese Women’s Rugby Super Cup) is a Portuguese national rugby union (rugby Sevens since 2012/13), organized by the Portuguese Rugby Federation, and disputed by the winners of national championship and Portuguese cup. Start in 2004/05.

Super Cup Rugby Champions

External links
 Portuguese Rugby Federation Official Website

http://rugby-pt-feminino.blogspot.co.uk/2009/03/1-divisao-historico.html

Final 2018: http://www.fpr.pt/news-detail/10030024/

Final 2019: http://www.fpr.pt/league/134292/

Women's rugby union competitions in Portugal
2004 establishments in Portugal